The 2018–19 Bangladesh Premier League (also known as TVS Bangladesh Premier League for sponsorship reason) is the 11th season of the Bangladesh Premier League since its establishment in 2007. A total of 13 football clubs will compete in the league. Dhaka Abahani are the defending champions. Bashundhara Kings and NoFeL Sporting Club entered as the promoted teams from the 2017 Bangladesh Championship League. The league was delayed and was rescheduled to start from 18 January 2019. Six venues will host 2019 Bangladesh Premier League. 2 clubs will be relegated to Bangladesh Championship League.

Rule changes
Bangladesh became the latest member association to adopt AFC's 3+1 rule which will allow clubs to recruit one player of Asian origin in addition to their regular quota of three foreigners.

The Bangladesh Football Federation executive committee decided to embrace the new AFC rule which encourages the mobility of talented Asian players and provides a fillip to the regional game.

Teams
Twelve teams were competed In previous season. This season, thirteen teams competed in the league, – the top eleven teams from the previous season and the two teams promoted from the Championship. The promoted teams were Bashundhara Kings and NoFeL Sporting Club (both the teams are playing BPL for the first time). They replaced Farashganj SC.

Stadiums and locations
FIFA and the AFC directed the BFF that matches of the professional league would have to organize at least five different venues.

Primarily, teams have applied for eight venues to the BFF. Abahani Limited, Sheikh Jamal Dhanmondi Club and Mohammedan Sporting Club, choose Bangabandhu National Stadium as their home venue. Arambagh and Saif Sporting Club applied for Mymensingh Stadium, Rahmatganj and Brothers for Birsreshtha Kamlapur Stadium, or Goplaganj Stadium, Sheikh Russel, Muktijoddha, newcomers Bashundhara Kings applied for Nilphamari Stadium, NOFEL for Noakhali, or MA Aziz Stadium in Chittagong, Team BJMC and Chittagong Abahani wanted Rajshahi Stadium as their home venue. After inspecting the facilities of these applied venues, BFF has sanctioned the following six stadiums for clubs:

Personnel and sponsoring

Coaching changes

Foreign players

League table

Results

Positions by round
The following table lists the positions of teams after each week of matches. In order to preserve the chronological evolution, any postponed matches are not included to the round at which they were originally scheduled but added to the full round they were played immediately afterward.

Season statistics

Top goalscorers 
As of 3 August 2019

Own goals 
† Bold Club indicates winner of the match

Hat-tricks 
† Bold Club indicates winner of the match

Clean sheets

Awards

References

Bangladesh
1
Bangladesh Football Premier League seasons